The Legend of Silent Night is a 1968 American television film directed by Daniel Mann and starring James Mason, Kirk Douglas and John Leyton.

Plot 
Pastor Josef Mohr shows his poem to the local church organist Franz Gruber and Gruber composes music to the lyrics resulting in "Silent Night".

Cast 
 James Mason as Franz Gruber
 Kirk Douglas as Narrator
 John Leyton as Pastor Joseph Mohr
 Claudia Butenuth as Gretchen
 Manfred Seipold as Ernst

Production 
The Legend of Silent Night was filmed in Salzburg and Vienna, Austria.

See also 
 Silent Night, Holy Night (1976)
 Silent Mouse (1988)

References

External links 
 

1968 films
1968 television films
American television films
Films set in Austria
Films set in the 1810s
American Christmas films
Christmas television films
1960s English-language films